Wikimedia chapters are national or sub-national not-for-profit organizations created to promote the interests of Wikimedia projects locally, by members of the movement. Chapters are legally independent of the Wikimedia Foundation, entering into an agreement with the foundation following acceptance by the Affiliations Committee (formerly known as "Chapters Committee"), and have no control over Foundation websites. They organize regional conferences, outreach, and global events such as Wikimania. As of August 2019 there were 40 recognized Wikimedia chapters in 38 countries.

List of chapters

National

Municipal

Former

Notes

References

Bibliography